The 2002–03 Segunda Divisão season was the 69th season of the competition and the 53rd season of recognised third-tier football in Portugal.

Overview
The league was contested by 59 teams in 3 divisions with CD Feirense, Leixões SC and GD Estoril Praia winning the respective divisional competitions and gaining promotion to the Liga de Honra.  The overall championship was won by Leixões SC.

League standings

Segunda Divisão – Zona Norte

Segunda Divisão – Zona Centro

Segunda Divisão – Zona Sul

Footnotes

External links
 Portuguese Division Two «B» – footballzz.co.uk

Portuguese Second Division seasons
Port
3